Chōkō-ji (朝光寺 Chōkōji)  is a Buddhist temple, in Yashiro, Hyōgo Prefecture, Japan.

History
According to the official record of the temple, this temple was originally constructed on the Mount Gongen in the 7th century, by Hodo-Shonin. In 1185, the temple moved to today's place. On the sutra of this temple, it is written that the Buddhist altar and the main sculpture of the Buddha was made in 1413.

Cultural properties
This temple has one National Treasure and one Important Cultural Property designated by the Japanese government.

National Treasures
The Main Hall

Important Cultural Property
The Belfry

See also
List of National Treasures of Japan (Temples)

References

External links

 

Buddhist temples in Hyōgo Prefecture
National Treasures of Japan
Important Cultural Properties of Japan
Kōyasan Shingon temples
7th-century establishments in Japan
7th-century Buddhist temples
Religious buildings and structures completed in 651